The fourth series of Dancing with the Stars premiered on 26 February 2008. The contestants were announced in two groups of four in December 2007 and January
2008.

Couples

Netball star Temepara George and her professional Stefano beat boxing champion Monty Betham and his pro Nerida.

Scorecard

Red numbers indicate the couples with the lowest score for each week.
Green numbers indicate the couples with the highest score for each week.
 indicates the couples eliminated that week.
 indicates the returning couple that finished in the bottom two.
 indicates the winning couple.
 indicates the runner-up couple.

Dance Chart

 Highest Scoring Dance
 Lowest Scoring Dance

Average chart

Week 1 
Individual judges scores in the chart below (given in parentheses) are listed in this order from left to right: Brendan, Alison, Craig, Paul.

Running order

Week 2
Musical guests: 
Running order

Week 3
Musical guests: Delta Goodrem
Running order

Week 4
Musical guests: Will Martin
Running order

Week 5 
Musical guests: Lizzie Marvelly
Running order

Week 6 
Musical guests:
Running order

Week 7 
Musical guests:
Running order

Week 8
Musical guests: 
Running order

References

series 4
2008 New Zealand television seasons